Thomas Milton Wallace (2 January 1912 – 20 April 1995) was a Canadian long-distance runner. He competed in the men's 5000 metres at the 1936 Summer Olympics.

References

External links
 

1912 births
1995 deaths
Athletes from Toronto
Athletes (track and field) at the 1936 Summer Olympics
Athletes (track and field) at the 1938 British Empire Games
Canadian male long-distance runners
Olympic track and field athletes of Canada